The 1928 United States House of Representatives elections were elections for the United States House of Representatives to elect members to serve in the 71st United States Congress. They were held for the most part on November 6, 1928, while Maine held theirs on September 10. They coincided with the election of President Herbert Hoover.

The strength of the U.S. economy resulted in Hoover's Republican Party victory in the election, helping them to scoop up 32 House seats, almost all from the opposition Democratic Party, thus increasing their majority. The big business-supported wing of the Republican Party continued to cement control. Republican gains proved even larger than anticipated during this election cycle, as an internal party feud over the Prohibition issue weakened Democratic standing. Losses of several rural, Protestant Democratic seats can be somewhat linked to anti-Catholic sentiments directed toward the party's presidential candidate, Al Smith. However, this would be the last time for 68 years that a Republican House was re-elected.

Results summary 

Source: Election Statistics - Office of the Clerk

Special elections 

In these special elections, the winner was elected during 1928; ordered by election date, then by district.

|-
! 
| William R. Green
|  | Republican
| 1911 
|  | Incumbent resigned March 31, 1928, after being appointed to the United States Court of Claims.New member elected June 4, 1928.Republican hold.Winner later lost election to the next term, see below.
| nowrap | 

|-
! 
| William B. Bowling
|  | Democratic
| 1920
|  | Incumbent resigned August 16, 1928, after being appointed judge of the 5th Judicial Circuit of Alabama.New member elected November 6, 1928.Democratic hold.Winner also elected to the next term, see below.
| nowrap | 

|-
! 
| James A. Gallivan
|  | Democratic
| 1914
|  | Incumbent died April 3, 1928.New member elected November 6, 1928.Democratic hold.Winner also elected to the next term, see below.
| nowrap | 

|-
! 
| Louis A. Frothingham
|  | Republican
| 1920
|  | Incumbent died August 23, 1928.New member elected November 6, 1928.Republican hold.Winner also elected to the next term, see below.
| nowrap | 

|-
! 
| Thaddeus C. Sweet
|  | Republican
| 1923 
|  | Incumbent died May 1, 1928.New member elected November 6, 1928.Republican hold.Winner also elected to the next term, see below.
| nowrap | 

|-
! 
| Nicholas J. Sinnott
|  | Republican
| 1912
|  | Incumbent resigned May 31, 1928, after being appointed to the United States Court of Claims.New member elected November 6, 1928.Republican hold.Winner also elected to the next term, see below.
| nowrap | 

|-
! 
| Thomas S. Butler
|  | Republican
| 1896
|  | Incumbent died May 26, 1928.New member elected November 6, 1928.Republican hold.Winner also elected to the next term, see below.
| nowrap | 

|}

Alabama 

|-
! 
| John McDuffie
|  | Democratic
| 1918
| Incumbent re-elected.
| nowrap | 

|-
! 
| J. Lister Hill
|  | Democratic
| 1923 
| Incumbent re-elected.
| nowrap | 

|-
! 
| Henry B. Steagall
|  | Democratic
| 1914
| Incumbent re-elected.
| nowrap | 

|-
! 
| Lamar Jeffers
|  | Democratic
| 1921 
| Incumbent re-elected.
| nowrap | 

|-
! 
| William B. Bowling
|  | Democratic
| 1920
|  | Incumbent resigned August 16, 1928, to become judge of the 5th Judicial Circuit of Alabama.New member elected November 6, 1928.Democratic hold.Winner also elected to finish the term, see above.
| nowrap | 

|-
! 
| William B. Oliver
|  | Democratic
| 1914
| Incumbent re-elected.
| nowrap | 

|-
! 
| Miles C. Allgood
|  | Democratic
| 1922
| Incumbent re-elected.
| nowrap | 

|-
! 
| Edward B. Almon
|  | Democratic
| 1914
| Incumbent re-elected.
| nowrap | 

|-
! 
| George Huddleston
|  | Democratic
| 1914
| Incumbent re-elected.
| nowrap | 

|-
! 
| William B. Bankhead
|  | Democratic
| 1916
| Incumbent re-elected.
| nowrap | 

|}

Arizona 

|-
! 
| Lewis W. Douglas
|  | Democratic
| 1926
| Incumbent re-elected.
| nowrap | 

|}

Alaska Territory 
See Non-voting delegates, below.

Arkansas 

|-
! 
| William J. Driver
|  | Democratic
| 1920
| Incumbent re-elected.
| nowrap | 

|-
! 
| William A. Oldfield
|  | Democratic
| 1908
| Incumbent re-elected.
| nowrap | 

|-
! 
| John N. Tillman
|  | Democratic
| 1914
|  | Incumbent retired.New member elected.Democratic hold.
| nowrap | 

|-
! 
| Otis Wingo
|  | Democratic
| 1912
| Incumbent re-elected.
| nowrap | 

|-
! 
| Heartsill Ragon
|  | Democratic
| 1922
| Incumbent re-elected.
| nowrap | 

|-
! 
| James B. Reed
|  | Democratic
| 1923 
|  | Incumbent lost renomination.New member elected.Democratic hold.
| nowrap | 

|-
! 
| Tilman B. Parks
|  | Democratic
| 1920
| Incumbent re-elected.
| nowrap | 

|}

California 

|-
! 
| Clarence F. Lea
|  | Democratic
| 1916
| Incumbent re-elected.
| nowrap | 

|-
! 
| Harry Lane Englebright
|  | Republican
| 1926
| Incumbent re-elected.
| nowrap | 

|-
! 
| Charles F. Curry
|  | Republican
| 1912
| Incumbent re-elected.
| nowrap | 

|-
! 
| Florence Prag Kahn
|  | Republican
| 1925 
| Incumbent re-elected.
| nowrap | 

|-
! 
| Richard J. Welch
|  | Republican
| 1926
| Incumbent re-elected.
| nowrap | 

|-
! 
| Albert E. Carter
|  | Republican
| 1924
| Incumbent re-elected.
| nowrap | 

|-
! 
| Henry E. Barbour
|  | Republican
| 1918
| Incumbent re-elected.
| nowrap | 

|-
! 
| Arthur M. Free
|  | Republican
| 1920
| Incumbent re-elected.
| nowrap | 

|-
! 
| William E. Evans
|  | Republican
| 1926
| Incumbent re-elected.
| nowrap | 

|-
! 
| Joe Crail
|  | Republican
| 1926
| Incumbent re-elected.
| nowrap | 

|-
! 
| Philip D. Swing
|  | Republican
| 1920
| Incumbent re-elected.
| nowrap | 

|}

Colorado 

|-
! 
| S. Harrison White
|  | Democratic
| 1927 
|  | Incumbent lost re-election.New member elected.Republican gain.
| nowrap | 

|-
! 
| Charles Bateman Timberlake
|  | Republican
| 1914
| Incumbent re-elected.
| nowrap | 

|-
! 
| Guy Urban Hardy
|  | Republican
| 1918
| Incumbent re-elected.
| nowrap | 

|-
! 
| Edward Thomas Taylor
|  | Democratic
| 1908
| Incumbent re-elected.
| nowrap | 

|}

Connecticut 

|-
! 
| E. Hart Fenn
|  | Republican
| 1920
| Incumbent re-elected.
| nowrap | 

|-
! 
| Richard P. Freeman
|  | Republican
| 1914
| Incumbent re-elected.
| nowrap | 

|-
! 
| John Q. Tilson
|  | Republican
| 1914
| Incumbent re-elected.
| nowrap | 

|-
! 
| Schuyler Merritt
|  | Republican
| 1916
| Incumbent re-elected.
| nowrap | 

|-
! 
| James P. Glynn
|  | Republican
| 1924
| Incumbent re-elected.
| nowrap | 

|}

Delaware 

|-
! 
| Robert G. Houston
|  | Republican
| 1924
| Incumbent re-elected.
| nowrap | 

|}

Florida 

|-
! 
| Herbert J. Drane
|  | Democratic
| 1916
| Incumbent re-elected.
| nowrap | 

|-
! 
| Robert A. Green
|  | Democratic
| 1924
| Incumbent re-elected.
| nowrap | 

|-
! 
| Tom A. Yon
|  | Democratic
| 1926
| Incumbent re-elected.
| nowrap | 

|-
! 
| William J. Sears
|  | Democratic
| 1914
|  | Incumbent lost renomination.New member elected.Democratic hold.
| nowrap | 

|}

Georgia 

|-
! 
| Charles Gordon Edwards
|  | Democratic
| 1924
| Incumbent re-elected.
| nowrap | 

|-
! 
| Edward E. Cox
|  | Democratic
| 1924
| Incumbent re-elected.
| nowrap | 

|-
! 
| Charles R. Crisp
|  | Democratic
| 1912
| Incumbent re-elected.
| nowrap | 

|-
! 
| William C. Wright
|  | Democratic
| 1918
| Incumbent re-elected.
| nowrap | 

|-
! 
| Leslie Jasper Steele
|  | Democratic
| 1926
| Incumbent re-elected.
| nowrap | 

|-
! 
| Samuel Rutherford
|  | Democratic
| 1924
| Incumbent re-elected.
| nowrap | 

|-
! 
| Malcolm C. Tarver
|  | Democratic
| 1926
| Incumbent re-elected.
| nowrap | 

|-
! 
| Charles H. Brand
|  | Democratic
| 1916
| Incumbent re-elected.
| nowrap | 

|-
! 
| Thomas Montgomery Bell
|  | Democratic
| 1904
| Incumbent re-elected.
| nowrap | 

|-
! 
| Carl Vinson
|  | Democratic
| 1914
| Incumbent re-elected.
| nowrap | 

|-
! 
| William C. Lankford
|  | Democratic
| 1918
| Incumbent re-elected.
| nowrap | 

|-
! 
| William W. Larsen
|  | Democratic
| 1916
| Incumbent re-elected.
| nowrap | 

|}

Hawaii Territory 
See Non-voting delegates, below.

Idaho 

|-
! 
| Burton L. French
|  | Republican
| 1916
| Incumbent re-elected.
| nowrap | 

|-
! 
| Addison T. Smith
|  | Republican
| 1912
| Incumbent re-elected.
| nowrap | 

|}

Illinois 

|-
! 
| Martin B. Madden
|  | Republican
| 1904
|  | Incumbent died April 27, 1928.New member elected.Republican hold.
| nowrap | 

|-
! 
| Morton D. Hull
|  | Republican
| 1923 
| Incumbent re-elected.
| nowrap | 

|-
! 
| Elliott W. Sproul
|  | Republican
| 1920
| Incumbent re-elected.
| nowrap | 

|-
! 
| Thomas A. Doyle
|  | Democratic
| 1923 
| Incumbent re-elected.
| nowrap | 

|-
! 
| Adolph J. Sabath
|  | Democratic
| 1906
| Incumbent re-elected.
| nowrap | 

|-
! 
| James T. Igoe
|  | Democratic
| 1926
| Incumbent re-elected.
| nowrap | 

|-
! 
| M. Alfred Michaelson
|  | Republican
| 1920
| Incumbent re-elected.
| nowrap | 

|-
! 
| Stanley H. Kunz
|  | Democratic
| 1920
| Incumbent re-elected.
| nowrap | 

|-
! 
| Frederick A. Britten
|  | Republican
| 1912
| Incumbent re-elected.
| nowrap | 

|-
! 
| Carl R. Chindblom
|  | Republican
| 1918
| Incumbent re-elected.
| nowrap | 

|-
! 
| Frank R. Reid
|  | Republican
| 1922
| Incumbent re-elected.
| nowrap | 

|-
! 
| John T. Buckbee
|  | Republican
| 1926
| Incumbent re-elected.
| nowrap | 

|-
! 
| William Richard Johnson
|  | Republican
| 1924
| Incumbent re-elected.
| nowrap | 

|-
! 
| John Clayton Allen
|  | Republican
| 1924
| Incumbent re-elected.
| nowrap | 

|-
! 
| Edward John King
|  | Republican
| 1914
| Incumbent re-elected.
| nowrap | 

|-
! 
| William E. Hull
|  | Republican
| 1922
| Incumbent re-elected.
| nowrap | 

|-
! 
| Homer W. Hall
|  | Republican
| 1926
| Incumbent re-elected.
| nowrap | 

|-
! 
| William P. Holaday
|  | Republican
| 1922
| Incumbent re-elected.
| nowrap | 

|-
! 
| Charles Adkins
|  | Republican
| 1924
| Incumbent re-elected.
| nowrap | 

|-
! 
| Henry T. Rainey
|  | Democratic
| 1922
| Incumbent re-elected.
| nowrap | 

|-
! 
| J. Earl Major
|  | Democratic
| 1926
|  | Incumbent lost re-election.New member elected.Republican gain.
| nowrap | 

|-
! 
| Edward M. Irwin
|  | Republican
| 1924
| Incumbent re-elected.
| nowrap | 

|-
! 
| William W. Arnold
|  | Democratic
| 1922
| Incumbent re-elected.
| nowrap | 

|-
! 
| Thomas Sutler Williams
|  | Republican
| 1914
| Incumbent re-elected.
| nowrap | 

|-
! 
| Edward E. Denison
|  | Republican
| 1914
| Incumbent re-elected.
| nowrap | 

|-
! rowspan=2 | 
| Richard Yates Jr.
|  | Republican
| 1918
| Incumbent re-elected.
| rowspan=2 nowrap | 

|-
| Henry Riggs Rathbone
|  | Republican
| 1922
|  | Incumbent died July 15, 1928.New member elected.Republican hold.

|}

Indiana 

|-
! 
| Harry E. Rowbottom
|  | Republican
| 1924
| Incumbent re-elected.
| nowrap | 

|-
! 
| Arthur H. Greenwood
|  | Democratic
| 1922
| Incumbent re-elected.
| nowrap | 

|-
! 
| Frank Gardner
|  | Democratic
| 1922
|  | Incumbent lost re-election.New member elected.Republican gain.
| nowrap | 

|-
! 
| Harry C. Canfield
|  | Democratic
| 1922
| Incumbent re-elected.
| nowrap | 

|-
! 
| Noble J. Johnson
|  | Republican
| 1924
| Incumbent re-elected.
| nowrap | 

|-
! 
| Richard N. Elliott
|  | Republican
| 1918
| Incumbent re-elected.
| nowrap | 

|-
! 
| Ralph E. Updike
|  | Republican
| 1924
|  | Incumbent lost re-election.New member elected.Democratic gain.
| nowrap | 

|-
! 
| Albert H. Vestal
|  | Republican
| 1916
| Incumbent re-elected.
| nowrap | 

|-
! 
| Fred S. Purnell
|  | Republican
| 1916
| Incumbent re-elected.
| nowrap | 

|-
! 
| William R. Wood
|  | Republican
| 1914
| Incumbent re-elected.
| nowrap | 

|-
! 
| Albert R. Hall
|  | Republican
| 1924
| Incumbent re-elected.
| nowrap | 

|-
! 
| David Hogg
|  | Republican
| 1924
| Incumbent re-elected.
| nowrap | 

|-
! 
| Andrew J. Hickey
|  | Republican
| 1918
| Incumbent re-elected.
| nowrap | 

|}

Iowa 

|-
! 
| William F. Kopp
|  | Republican
| 1920
| Incumbent re-elected.
| nowrap | 

|-
! 
| F. Dickinson Letts
|  | Republican
| 1924
| Incumbent re-elected.
| nowrap | 

|-
! 
| Thomas J. B. Robinson
|  | Republican
| 1922
| Incumbent re-elected.
| nowrap | 

|-
! 
| Gilbert N. Haugen
|  | Republican
| 1898
| Incumbent re-elected.
| nowrap | 

|-
! 
| Cyrenus Cole
|  | Republican
| 1921 
| Incumbent re-elected.
| nowrap | 

|-
! 
| C. William Ramseyer
|  | Republican
| 1914
| Incumbent re-elected.
| nowrap | 

|-
! 
| Cassius C. Dowell
|  | Republican
| 1914
| Incumbent re-elected.
| nowrap | 

|-
! 
| Lloyd Thurston
|  | Republican
| 1924
| Incumbent re-elected.
| nowrap | 

|-
! 
| Earl W. Vincent
|  | Republican
| 1928 
|  | Incumbent lost renomination.New member elected.Republican hold.
| nowrap | 

|-
! 
| Lester J. Dickinson
|  | Republican
| 1918
| Incumbent re-elected.
| nowrap | 

|-
! 
| William D. Boies
|  | Republican
| 1918
|  | Incumbent retired.New member elected.Republican hold.
| nowrap | 

|}

Kansas 

|-
! 
| Daniel R. Anthony Jr.
|  | Republican
| 1907 
|  | Incumbent retired.New member elected.Republican hold.
| nowrap | 

|-
! 
| Ulysses Samuel Guyer
|  | Republican
| 1926
| Incumbent re-elected.
| nowrap | 

|-
! 
| William H. Sproul
|  | Republican
| 1922
| Incumbent re-elected.
| nowrap | 

|-
! 
| Homer Hoch
|  | Republican
| 1918
| Incumbent re-elected.
| nowrap | 

|-
! 
| James G. Strong
|  | Republican
| 1918
| Incumbent re-elected.
| nowrap | 

|-
! 
| Hays B. White
|  | Republican
| 1918
|  | Incumbent retired.New member elected.Republican hold.
| nowrap | 

|-
! 
| Clifford R. Hope
|  | Republican
| 1926
| Incumbent re-elected.
| nowrap | 

|-
! 
| William A. Ayres
|  | Democratic
| 19141920 1922
| Incumbent re-elected.
| nowrap | 

|}

Kentucky 

|-
! 
| William Voris Gregory
|  | Democratic
| 1926
| Incumbent re-elected.
| nowrap | 

|-
! 
| David Hayes Kincheloe
|  | Democratic
| 1914
| Incumbent re-elected.
| nowrap | 

|-
! 
| John William Moore
|  | Democratic
| 1925 
|  | Incumbent lost re-election.New member elected.Republican gain.
| nowrap | 

|-
! 
| Henry D. Moorman
|  | Democratic
| 1926
|  | Incumbent lost re-election.New member elected.Republican gain.
| nowrap | 

|-
! 
| Maurice H. Thatcher
|  | Republican
| 1922
| Incumbent re-elected.
| nowrap | 

|-
! 
| Orie Solomon Ware
|  | Democratic
| 1926
|  | Incumbent retired.New member elected.Republican gain.
| nowrap | 

|-
! 
| Virgil Chapman
|  | Democratic
| 1924
|  | Incumbent lost re-election.New member elected.Republican gain.
| nowrap | 

|-
! 
| Ralph Waldo Emerson Gilbert
|  | Democratic
| 1920
|  | Incumbent lost re-election.New member elected.Republican gain.
| nowrap | 

|-
! 
| Fred M. Vinson
|  | Democratic
| 1924
|  | Incumbent lost re-election.New member elected.Republican gain.
| nowrap | 

|-
! 
| Katherine Langley
|  | Republican
| 1926
| Incumbent re-elected.
| nowrap | 

|-
! 
| John M. Robsion
|  | Republican
| 1918
| Incumbent re-elected.
| nowrap | 

|}

Louisiana 

|-
! 
| James O'Connor
|  | Democratic
| 1918
| Incumbent re-elected.
| nowrap | 

|-
! 
| James Zacharie Spearing
|  | Democratic
| 1924
| Incumbent re-elected.
| nowrap | 

|-
! 
| Whitmell P. Martin
|  | Democratic
| 1914
| Incumbent re-elected.
| nowrap | 

|-
! 
| John N. Sandlin
|  | Democratic
| 1920
| Incumbent re-elected.
| nowrap | 

|-
! 
| Riley Joseph Wilson
|  | Democratic
| 1914
| Incumbent re-elected.
| nowrap | 

|-
! 
| Bolivar E. Kemp
|  | Democratic
| 1924
| Incumbent re-elected.
| nowrap | 

|-
! 
| René Louis DeRouen
|  | Democratic
| 1927 
| Incumbent re-elected.
| nowrap | 

|-
! 
| James Benjamin Aswell
|  | Democratic
| 1912
| Incumbent re-elected.
| nowrap | 

|}

Maine 

|-
! 
| Carroll L. Beedy
|  | Republican
| 1920
| Incumbent re-elected.
| nowrap | 

|-
! 
| Wallace H. White Jr.
|  | Republican
| 1916
| Incumbent re-elected.
| nowrap | 

|-
! 
| John E. Nelson
|  | Republican
| 1922
| Incumbent re-elected.
| nowrap | 

|-
! 
| Ira G. Hersey
|  | Republican
| 1916
|  | Incumbent lost renomination.New member elected.Republican hold.
| nowrap | 

|}

Maryland 

|-
! 
| T. Alan Goldsborough
|  | Democratic
| 1920
| Incumbent re-elected.
| nowrap | 

|-
! 
| William P. Cole Jr.
|  | Democratic
| 1926
|  | Incumbent lost re-election.New member elected.Republican gain.
| nowrap | 

|-
! 
| Vincent Luke Palmisano
|  | Democratic
| 1926
| Incumbent re-elected.
| nowrap | 

|-
! 
| J. Charles Linthicum
|  | Democratic
| 1910
| Incumbent re-elected.
| nowrap | 

|-
! 
| Stephen W. Gambrill
|  | Democratic
| 1924
| Incumbent re-elected.
| nowrap | 

|-
! 
| Frederick N. Zihlman
|  | Republican
| 1916
| Incumbent re-elected.
| nowrap | 

|}

Massachusetts 

|-
! 
| Allen T. Treadway
|  | Republican
| 1912
| Incumbent re-elected.
| nowrap | 

|-
! 
| Henry L. Bowles
|  | Republican
| 1925 
|  | Incumbent retired.New member elected.Republican hold.
| nowrap | 

|-
! 
| Frank H. Foss
|  | Republican
| 1924
| Incumbent re-elected.
| nowrap | 

|-
! 
| George R. Stobbs
|  | Republican
| 1924
| Incumbent re-elected.
| nowrap | 

|-
! 
| Edith Nourse Rogers
|  | Republican
| 1925 
| Incumbent re-elected.
| nowrap | 

|-
! 
| Abram Andrew
|  | Republican
| 1921 
| Incumbent re-elected.
| nowrap | 

|-
! 
| William P. Connery Jr.
|  | Democratic
| 1922
| Incumbent re-elected.
| nowrap | 

|-
! 
| Frederick W. Dallinger
|  | Republican
| 1926
| Incumbent re-elected.
| nowrap | 

|-
! 
| Charles L. Underhill
|  | Republican
| 1920
| Incumbent re-elected.
| nowrap | 

|-
! 
| John J. Douglass
|  | Democratic
| 1924
| Incumbent re-elected.
| nowrap | 

|-
! 
| George H. Tinkham
|  | Republican
| 1914
| Incumbent re-elected.
| nowrap | 

|-
! 
| James A. Gallivan
|  | Democratic
| 1914
|  | Incumbent died April 3, 1928.New member elected.Democratic hold.Winner also elected to finish the term, see above.
| nowrap | 

|-
! 
| Robert Luce
|  | Republican
| 1918
| Incumbent re-elected.
| nowrap | 

|-
! 
| Louis A. Frothingham
|  | Republican
| 1920
|  | Incumbent died August 23, 1928.New member elected.Republican hold.Winner also elected to finish the term, see above.
| nowrap | 

|-
! 
| Joseph William Martin Jr.
|  | Republican
| 1924
| Incumbent re-elected.
| nowrap | 

|-
! 
| Charles L. Gifford
|  | Republican
| 1922
| Incumbent re-elected.
| nowrap | 

|}

Michigan 

|-
! 
| Robert H. Clancy
|  | Republican
| 1926
| Incumbent re-elected.
| nowrap | 

|-
! 
| Earl C. Michener
|  | Republican
| 1918
| Incumbent re-elected.
| nowrap | 

|-
! 
| Joseph L. Hooper
|  | Republican
| 1925 
| Incumbent re-elected.
| nowrap | 

|-
! 
| John C. Ketcham
|  | Republican
| 1920
| Incumbent re-elected.
| nowrap | 

|-
! 
| Carl E. Mapes
|  | Republican
| 1912
| Incumbent re-elected.
| nowrap | 

|-
! 
| Grant M. Hudson
|  | Republican
| 1922
| Incumbent re-elected.
| nowrap | 

|-
! 
| Louis C. Cramton
|  | Republican
| 1912
| Incumbent re-elected.
| nowrap | 

|-
! 
| Bird J. Vincent
|  | Republican
| 1922
| Incumbent re-elected.
| nowrap | 

|-
! 
| James C. McLaughlin
|  | Republican
| 1906
| Incumbent re-elected.
| nowrap | 

|-
! 
| Roy O. Woodruff
|  | Republican
| 1920
| Incumbent re-elected.
| nowrap | 

|-
! 
| Frank P. Bohn
|  | Republican
| 1926
| Incumbent re-elected.
| nowrap | 

|-
! 
| W. Frank James
|  | Republican
| 1914
| Incumbent re-elected.
| nowrap | 

|-
! 
| Clarence J. McLeod
|  | Republican
| 1922
| Incumbent re-elected.
| nowrap | 

|}

Minnesota 

|-
! 
| Allen J. Furlow
|  | Republican
| 1924
|  | Incumbent lost renomination.New member elected.Republican hold.
| nowrap | 

|-
! 
| Frank Clague
|  | Republican
| 1920
| Incumbent re-elected.
| nowrap | 

|-
! 
| August H. Andresen
|  | Republican
| 1924
| Incumbent re-elected.
| nowrap | 

|-
! 
| Melvin J. Maas
|  | Republican
| 1926
| Incumbent re-elected.
| nowrap | 

|-
! 
| Walter Newton
|  | Republican
| 1918
| Incumbent re-elected.
| nowrap | 

|-
! 
| Harold Knutson
|  | Republican
| 1916
| Incumbent re-elected.
| nowrap | 

|-
! 
| Ole J. Kvale
|  | Farmer–Labor
| 1922
| Incumbent re-elected.
| nowrap | 

|-
! 
| William L. Carss
|  | Farmer–Labor
| 1924
|  | Incumbent lost re-election.New member elected.Republican gain.
| nowrap | 

|-
! 
| Conrad Selvig
|  | Republican
| 1926
| Incumbent re-elected.
| nowrap | 

|-
! 
| Godfrey G. Goodwin
|  | Republican
| 1924
| Incumbent re-elected.
| nowrap | 

|}

Mississippi 

|-
! 
| John E. Rankin
|  | Democratic
| 1920
| Incumbent re-elected.
| nowrap | 

|-
! 
| Bill G. Lowrey
|  | Democratic
| 1920
|  | Incumbent lost renomination.New member elected.Democratic hold.
| nowrap | 

|-
! 
| William Madison Whittington
|  | Democratic
| 1924
| Incumbent re-elected.
| nowrap | 

|-
! 
| Jeff Busby
|  | Democratic
| 1922
| Incumbent re-elected.
| nowrap | 

|-
! 
| Ross A. Collins
|  | Democratic
| 1920
| Incumbent re-elected.
| nowrap | 

|-
! 
| T. Webber Wilson
|  | Democratic
| 1922
|  | Ran for U. S. SenateDemocratic hold.
| nowrap | 

|-
! 
| Percy E. Quin
|  | Democratic
| 1912
| Incumbent re-elected.
| nowrap | 

|-
! 
| James W. Collier
|  | Democratic
| 1908
| Incumbent re-elected.
| nowrap | 

|}

Missouri 

|-
! 
| Milton A. Romjue
|  | Democratic
| 1922
| Incumbent re-elected.
| nowrap | 

|-
! 
| Ralph F. Lozier
|  | Democratic
| 1922
| Incumbent re-elected.
| nowrap | 

|-
! 
| Jacob L. Milligan
|  | Democratic
| 1922
| Incumbent re-elected.
| nowrap | 

|-
! 
| Charles L. Faust
|  | Republican
| 1920
| Incumbent re-elected.
| nowrap | 

|-
! 
| George H. Combs Jr.
|  | Democratic
| 1926
|  | Incumbent lost re-election.New member elected.Republican gain.
| nowrap | 

|-
! 
| Clement C. Dickinson
|  | Democratic
| 1922
|  | Incumbent lost re-election.New member elected.Republican gain.
| nowrap | 

|-
! 
| Samuel C. Major
|  | Democratic
| 1922
|  | Incumbent lost re-election.New member elected.Republican gain.
| nowrap | 

|-
! 
| William L. Nelson
|  | Democratic
| 1924
| Incumbent re-elected.
| nowrap | 

|-
! 
| Clarence Cannon
|  | Democratic
| 1922
| Incumbent re-elected.
| nowrap | 

|-
! 
| Henry F. Niedringhaus
|  | Republican
| 1926
| Incumbent re-elected.
| nowrap | 

|-
! 
| John J. Cochran
|  | Democratic
| 1926
| Incumbent re-elected.
| nowrap | 

|-
! 
| Leonidas C. Dyer
|  | Republican
| 1914
| Incumbent re-elected.
| nowrap | 

|-
! 
| Clyde Williams
|  | Democratic
| 1926
|  | Incumbent lost re-election.New member elected.Republican gain.
| nowrap | 

|-
! 
| James F. Fulbright
|  | Democratic
| 1926
|  | Incumbent lost re-election.New member elected.Republican gain.
| nowrap | 

|-
! 
| Joe J. Manlove
|  | Republican
| 1922
| Incumbent re-elected.
| nowrap | 

|-
! 
| Thomas L. Rubey
|  | Democratic
| 1922
|  | Incumbent died November 2, 1928.New member elected.Republican gain.
| nowrap | 

|}

Montana 

|-
! 
| John M. Evans
|  | Democratic
| 1922
| Incumbent re-elected.
| nowrap | 

|-
! 
| Scott Leavitt
|  | Republican
| 1922
| Incumbent re-elected.
| nowrap | 

|}

Nebraska 

|-
! 
| John H. Morehead
|  | Democratic
| 1922
| Incumbent re-elected.
| nowrap | 

|-
! 
| Willis G. Sears
|  | Republican
| 1922
| Incumbent re-elected.
| nowrap | 

|-
! 
| Edgar Howard
|  | Democratic
| 1922
| Incumbent re-elected.
| nowrap | 

|-
! 
| John N. Norton
|  | Democratic
| 1926
|  | Incumbent lost re-election.New member elected.Republican gain.
| nowrap | 

|-
! 
| Ashton C. Shallenberger
|  | Democratic
| 1922
|  | Incumbent lost re-election.New member elected.Republican gain.
| nowrap | 

|-
! 
| Robert G. Simmons
|  | Republican
| 1922
| Incumbent re-elected.
| nowrap | 

|}

Nevada 

|-
! 
| Samuel S. Arentz
|  | Republican
| 1924
| Incumbent re-elected.
| nowrap | 

|}

New Hampshire 

|-
! 
| Fletcher Hale
|  | Republican
| 1924
| Incumbent re-elected.
| nowrap | 

|-
! 
| Edward Hills Wason
|  | Republican
| 1914
| Incumbent re-elected.
| nowrap | 

|}

New Jersey 

|-
! 
| Charles A. Wolverton
|  | Republican
| 1926
| Incumbent re-elected.
| nowrap | 

|-
! 
| Isaac Bacharach
|  | Republican
| 1914
| Incumbent re-elected.
| nowrap | 

|-
! 
| Harold G. Hoffman
|  | Republican
| 1926
| Incumbent re-elected.
| nowrap | 

|-
! 
| Charles A. Eaton
|  | Republican
| 1924
| Incumbent re-elected.
| nowrap | 

|-
! 
| Ernest R. Ackerman
|  | Republican
| 1918
| Incumbent re-elected.
| nowrap | 

|-
! 
| Randolph Perkins
|  | Republican
| 1920
| Incumbent re-elected.
| nowrap | 

|-
! 
| George N. Seger
|  | Republican
| 1922
| Incumbent re-elected.
| nowrap | 

|-
! 
| Paul J. Moore
|  | Democratic
| 1926
|  | Incumbent lost re-election.New member elected.Republican gain.
| nowrap | 

|-
! 
| Franklin W. Fort
|  | Republican
| 1924
| Incumbent re-elected.
| nowrap | 

|-
! 
| Frederick R. Lehlbach
|  | Republican
| 1914
| Incumbent re-elected.
| nowrap | 

|-
! 
| Oscar L. Auf der Heide
|  | Democratic
| 1924
| Incumbent re-elected.
| nowrap | 

|-
! 
| Mary Teresa Norton
|  | Democratic
| 1924
| Incumbent re-elected.
| nowrap | 

|}

New Mexico 

|-
! 
| John Morrow
|  | Democratic
| 1922
|  | Incumbent lost re-election.New member elected.Republican gain.
| nowrap | 

|}

New York 

|-
! 
| Robert L. Bacon
|  | Republican
| 1922
| Incumbent re-elected.
| nowrap | 

|-
! 
| John J. Kindred
|  | Democratic
| 1920
|  | Incumbent retired.New member elected.Democratic hold.
| nowrap | 

|-
! 
| George W. Lindsay
|  | Democratic
| 1922
| Incumbent re-elected.
| nowrap | 

|-
! 
| Thomas H. Cullen
|  | Democratic
| 1918
| Incumbent re-elected.
| nowrap | 

|-
! 
| Loring M. Black Jr.
|  | Democratic
| 1922
| Incumbent re-elected.
| nowrap | 

|-
! 
| Andrew Lawrence Somers
|  | Democratic
| 1924
| Incumbent re-elected.
| nowrap | 

|-
! 
| John F. Quayle
|  | Democratic
| 1922
| Incumbent re-elected.
| nowrap | 

|-
! 
| Patrick J. Carley
|  | Democratic
| 1926
| Incumbent re-elected.
| nowrap | 

|-
! 
| David J. O'Connell
|  | Democratic
| 1922
| Incumbent re-elected.
| nowrap | 

|-
! 
| Emanuel Celler
|  | Democratic
| 1922
| Incumbent re-elected.
| nowrap | 

|-
! 
| Anning S. Prall
|  | Democratic
| 1923 
| Incumbent re-elected.
| nowrap | 

|-
! 
| Samuel Dickstein
|  | Democratic
| 1922
| Incumbent re-elected.
| nowrap | 

|-
! 
| Christopher D. Sullivan
|  | Democratic
| 1916
| Incumbent re-elected.
| nowrap | 

|-
! 
| William Irving Sirovich
|  | Democratic
| 1926
| Incumbent re-elected.
| nowrap | 

|-
! 
| John J. Boylan
|  | Democratic
| 1922
| Incumbent re-elected.
| nowrap | 

|-
! 
| John J. O'Connor
|  | Democratic
| 1923 
| Incumbent re-elected.
| nowrap | 

|-
! 
| William W. Cohen
|  | Democratic
| 1926
|  | Incumbent retired.New member elected.Republican gain.
| nowrap | 

|-
! 
| John F. Carew
|  | Democratic
| 1912
| Incumbent re-elected.
| nowrap | 

|-
! 
| Sol Bloom
|  | Democratic
| 1923 
| Incumbent re-elected.
| nowrap | 

|-
! 
| Fiorello H. LaGuardia
|  | Republican
| 1922
| Incumbent re-elected.
| nowrap | 

|-
! 
| Royal H. Weller
|  | Democratic
| 1922
| Incumbent re-elected.
| nowrap | 

|-
! 
| Anthony J. Griffin
|  | Democratic
| 1918
| Incumbent re-elected.
| nowrap | 

|-
! 
| Frank Oliver
|  | Democratic
| 1922
| Incumbent re-elected.
| nowrap | 

|-
! 
| James M. Fitzpatrick
|  | Democratic
| 1926
| Incumbent re-elected.
| nowrap | 

|-
! 
| J. Mayhew Wainwright
|  | Republican
| 1922
| Incumbent re-elected.
| nowrap | 

|-
! 
| Hamilton Fish Jr.
|  | Republican
| 1920
| Incumbent re-elected.
| nowrap | 

|-
! 
| Harcourt J. Pratt
|  | Republican
| 1924
| Incumbent re-elected.
| nowrap | 

|-
! 
| Parker Corning
|  | Democratic
| 1922
| Incumbent re-elected.
| nowrap | 

|-
! 
| James S. Parker
|  | Republican
| 1912
| Incumbent re-elected.
| nowrap | 

|-
! 
| Frank Crowther
|  | Republican
| 1918
| Incumbent re-elected.
| nowrap | 

|-
! 
| Bertrand Snell
|  | Republican
| 1915 
| Incumbent re-elected.
| nowrap | 

|-
! 
| Thaddeus C. Sweet
|  | Republican
| 1923 
|  | Incumbent died May 1, 1928.New member elected.Republican hold.Winner also elected to finish the term, see above.
| nowrap | 

|-
! 
| Frederick M. Davenport
|  | Republican
| 1924
| Incumbent re-elected.
| nowrap | 

|-
! 
| John D. Clarke
|  | Republican
| 1926
| Incumbent re-elected.
| nowrap | 

|-
! 
| Clarence E. Hancock
|  | Republican
| 1927 
| Incumbent re-elected.
| nowrap | 

|-
! 
| John Taber
|  | Republican
| 1922
| Incumbent re-elected.
| nowrap | 

|-
! 
| Gale H. Stalker
|  | Republican
| 1922
| Incumbent re-elected.
| nowrap | 

|-
! 
| Meyer Jacobstein
|  | Democratic
| 1922
|  | Incumbent retired.New member elected.Republican gain.
| nowrap | 

|-
! 
| Archie D. Sanders
|  | Republican
| 1916
| Incumbent re-elected.
| nowrap | 

|-
! 
| S. Wallace Dempsey
|  | Republican
| 1914
| Incumbent re-elected.
| nowrap | 

|-
! 
| Clarence MacGregor
|  | Republican
| 1918
|  | Incumbent retired to New York Supreme Court justice.New member elected.Republican hold.
| nowrap | 

|-
! 
| James M. Mead
|  | Democratic
| 1918
| Incumbent re-elected.
| nowrap | 

|-
! 
| Daniel A. Reed
|  | Republican
| 1918
| Incumbent re-elected.
| nowrap | 

|}

North Carolina 

|-
! 
| Lindsay C. Warren
|  | Democratic
| 1924
| Incumbent re-elected.
| nowrap | 

|-
! 
| John H. Kerr
|  | Democratic
| 1923 
| Incumbent re-elected.
| nowrap | 

|-
! 
| Charles L. Abernethy
|  | Democratic
| 1922
| Incumbent re-elected.
| nowrap | 

|-
! 
| Edward W. Pou
|  | Democratic
| 1900
| Incumbent re-elected.
| nowrap | 

|-
! 
| Charles Manly Stedman
|  | Democratic
| 1910
| Incumbent re-elected.
| nowrap | 

|-
! 
| Homer L. Lyon
|  | Democratic
| 1920
|  | Incumbent retired.New member elected.Democratic hold.
| nowrap | 

|-
! 
| William C. Hammer
|  | Democratic
| 1920
| Incumbent re-elected.
| nowrap | 

|-
! 
| Robert L. Doughton
|  | Democratic
| 1910
| Incumbent re-elected.
| nowrap | 

|-
! 
| Alfred L. Bulwinkle
|  | Democratic
| 1920
|  | Incumbent lost re-election.New member elected.Republican gain.
| nowrap | 

|-
! 
| Zebulon Weaver
|  | Democratic
| 1916
|  | Incumbent lost re-election.New member elected.Republican gain.
| nowrap | 

|}

North Dakota 

|-
! 
| Olger B. Burtness
|  | Republican
| 1920
| Incumbent re-elected.
| nowrap | 

|-
! 
| Thomas Hall
|  | Republican
| 1924
| Incumbent re-elected.
| nowrap | 

|-
! 
| James H. Sinclair
|  | Republican
| 1918
| Incumbent re-elected.
| nowrap | 

|}

Ohio 

|-
! 
| Nicholas Longworth
|  | Republican
| 1914
| Incumbent re-elected.
| nowrap | 

|-
! 
| Charles Tatgenhorst Jr.
|  | Republican
| 1927 
|  | Incumbent retired.New member elected.Republican hold.
| nowrap | 

|-
! 
| Roy G. Fitzgerald
|  | Republican
| 1920
| Incumbent re-elected.
| nowrap | 

|-
! 
| William T. Fitzgerald
|  | Republican
| 1924
|  | Incumbent retired.New member elected.Republican hold.
| nowrap | 

|-
! 
| Charles J. Thompson
|  | Republican
| 1918
| Incumbent re-elected.
| nowrap | 

|-
! 
| Charles C. Kearns
|  | Republican
| 1914
| Incumbent re-elected.
| nowrap | 

|-
! 
| Charles Brand
|  | Republican
| 1922
| Incumbent re-elected.
| nowrap | 

|-
! 
| Thomas B. Fletcher
|  | Democratic
| 1924
|  | Incumbent lost re-election.New member elected.Republican gain.
| nowrap | 

|-
! 
| William W. Chalmers
|  | Republican
| 1924
| Incumbent re-elected.
| nowrap | 

|-
! 
| Thomas A. Jenkins
|  | Republican
| 1924
| Incumbent re-elected.
| nowrap | 

|-
! 
| Mell G. Underwood
|  | Democratic
| 1922
| Incumbent re-elected.
| nowrap | 

|-
! 
| John C. Speaks
|  | Republican
| 1920
| Incumbent re-elected.
| nowrap | 

|-
! 
| James T. Begg
|  | Republican
| 1918
|  | Incumbent retired.New member elected.Republican hold.
| nowrap | 

|-
! 
| Martin L. Davey
|  | Democratic
| 1922
|  | Incumbent retired to run for U.S. Senate.New member elected.Republican gain.
| nowrap | 

|-
! 
| C. Ellis Moore
|  | Republican
| 1918
| Incumbent re-elected.
| nowrap | 

|-
! 
| John McSweeney
|  | Democratic
| 1922
|  | Incumbent lost re-election.New member elected.Republican gain.
| nowrap | 

|-
! 
| William M. Morgan
|  | Republican
| 1920
| Incumbent re-elected.
| nowrap | 

|-
! 
| B. Frank Murphy
|  | Republican
| 1918
| Incumbent re-elected.
| nowrap | 

|-
! 
| John G. Cooper
|  | Republican
| 1914
| Incumbent re-elected.
| nowrap | 

|-
! 
| Charles A. Mooney
|  | Democratic
| 1922
| Incumbent re-elected.
| nowrap | 

|-
! 
| Robert Crosser
|  | Democratic
| 1922
| Incumbent re-elected.
| nowrap | 

|-
! 
| Theodore E. Burton
|  | Republican
| 1920
|  | Incumbent retired to run for U.S. Senate.New member elected.Republican hold.
| nowrap | 

|}

Oklahoma 

|-
! 
| Everette B. Howard
|  | Democratic
| 1926
|  | Incumbent lost re-election.New member elected.Republican gain.
| nowrap | 

|-
! 
| William W. Hastings
|  | Democratic
| 1922
| Incumbent re-elected.
| nowrap | 

|-
! 
| Wilburn Cartwright
|  | Democratic
| 1926
| Incumbent re-elected.
| nowrap | 

|-
! 
| Tom D. McKeown
|  | Democratic
| 1922
| Incumbent re-elected.
| nowrap | 

|-
! 
| Fletcher B. Swank
|  | Democratic
| 1920
|  | Incumbent lost re-election.New member elected.Republican gain.
| nowrap | 

|-
! 
| Jed Johnson
|  | Democratic
| 1926
| Incumbent re-elected.
| nowrap | 

|-
! 
| James V. McClintic
|  | Democratic
| 1914
| Incumbent re-elected.
| nowrap | 

|-
! 
| Milton C. Garber
|  | Republican
| 1922
| Incumbent re-elected.
| nowrap | 

|}

Oregon 

|-
! 
| Willis C. Hawley
|  | Republican
| 1906
| Incumbent re-elected.
| nowrap | 

|-
! 
| Nicholas J. Sinnott
|  | Republican
| 1912
|  | Incumbent resigned May 31, 1928, after being appointed to the United States Court of Claims.New member elected November 6, 1928.Republican hold.Winner also elected to finish the term, see above.
| nowrap | 

|-
! 
| Franklin F. Korell
|  | Republican
| 1927 
| Incumbent re-elected.
| nowrap | 

|}

Pennsylvania 

|-
! 
| James M. Beck
|  | Republican
| 1927 
| Incumbent re-elected.
| nowrap | 

|-
! 
| George S. Graham
|  | Republican
| 1912
| Incumbent re-elected.
| nowrap | 

|-
! 
| Harry C. Ransley
|  | Republican
| 1920
| Incumbent re-elected.
| nowrap | 

|-
! 
| Benjamin M. Golder
|  | Republican
| 1924
| Incumbent re-elected.
| nowrap | 

|-
! 
| James J. Connolly
|  | Republican
| 1920
| Incumbent re-elected.
| nowrap | 

|-
! 
| George A. Welsh
|  | Republican
| 1922
| Incumbent re-elected.
| nowrap | 

|-
! 
| George P. Darrow
|  | Republican
| 1914
| Incumbent re-elected.
| nowrap | 

|-
! 
| Thomas S. Butler
|  | Republican
| 1896
|  | Incumbent died May 26, 1928.New member elected.Republican hold.Winner also elected to finish the term, see above.
| nowrap | 

|-
! 
| Henry Winfield Watson
|  | Republican
| 1914
| Incumbent re-elected.
| nowrap | 

|-
! 
| William Walton Griest
|  | Republican
| 1908
| Incumbent re-elected.
| nowrap | 

|-
! 
| Laurence H. Watres
|  | Republican
| 1922
| Incumbent re-elected.
| nowrap | 

|-
! 
| John J. Casey
|  | Democratic
| 1926
| Incumbent re-elected.
| nowrap | 

|-
! 
| Cyrus Maffet Palmer
|  | Republican
| 1926
|  | Incumbent lost renomination.New member elected.Republican hold.
| nowrap | 

|-
! 
| Robert Grey Bushong
|  | Republican
| 1926
|  | Incumbent retired.New member elected.Republican hold.
| nowrap | 

|-
! 
| Louis T. McFadden
|  | Republican
| 1914
| Incumbent re-elected.
| nowrap | 

|-
! 
| Edgar R. Kiess
|  | Republican
| 1912
| Incumbent re-elected.
| nowrap | 

|-
! 
| Frederick W. Magrady
|  | Republican
| 1924
| Incumbent re-elected.
| nowrap | 

|-
! 
| Edward M. Beers
|  | Republican
| 1922
| Incumbent re-elected.
| nowrap | 

|-
! 
| Isaac Hoffer Doutrich
|  | Republican
| 1926
| Incumbent re-elected.
| nowrap | 

|-
! 
| James Russell Leech
|  | Republican
| 1926
| Incumbent re-elected.
| nowrap | 

|-
! 
| J. Banks Kurtz
|  | Republican
| 1922
| Incumbent re-elected.
| nowrap | 

|-
! 
| Franklin Menges
|  | Republican
| 1924
| Incumbent re-elected.
| nowrap | 

|-
! 
| James Mitchell Chase
|  | Republican
| 1926
| Incumbent re-elected.
| nowrap | 

|-
! 
| Samuel Austin Kendall
|  | Republican
| 1918
| Incumbent re-elected.
| nowrap | 

|-
! 
| Henry Wilson Temple
|  | Republican
| 1912
| Incumbent re-elected.
| nowrap | 

|-
! 
| J. Howard Swick
|  | Republican
| 1926
| Incumbent re-elected.
| nowrap | 

|-
! 
| Nathan Leroy Strong
|  | Republican
| 1916
| Incumbent re-elected.
| nowrap | 

|-
! 
| Thomas Cunningham Cochran
|  | Republican
| 1926
| Incumbent re-elected.
| nowrap | 

|-
! 
| Milton W. Shreve
|  | Republican
| 1918
| Incumbent re-elected.
| nowrap | 

|-
! 
| Everett Kent
|  | Democratic
| 1926
|  | Incumbent lost re-election.New member elected.Republican gain.
| nowrap | 

|-
! 
| Adam M. Wyant
|  | Republican
| 1920
| Incumbent re-elected.
| nowrap | 

|-
! 
| Stephen Geyer Porter
|  | Republican
| 1910
| Incumbent re-elected.
| nowrap | 

|-
! 
| Melville Clyde Kelly
|  | Republican
| 1916
| Incumbent re-elected.
| nowrap | 

|-
! 
| John M. Morin
|  | Republican
| 1912
|  | Incumbent lost renomination.New member elected.Republican hold.
| nowrap | 

|-
! 
| Harry A. Estep
|  | Republican
| 1926
| Incumbent re-elected.
| nowrap | 

|-
! 
| Guy E. Campbell
|  | Republican
| 1916
| Incumbent re-elected.
| nowrap | 

|}

Philippines 
See Non-voting delegates, below.

Rhode Island 

|-
! 
| Clark Burdick
|  | Republican
| 1918
| Incumbent re-elected.
| nowrap | 

|-
! 
| Richard S. Aldrich
|  | Republican
| 1922
| Incumbent re-elected.
| nowrap | 

|-
! 
| Louis Monast
|  | Republican
| 1926
|  | Incumbent lost re-election.New member elected.Democratic gain.
| nowrap | 

|}

South Carolina 

|-
! 
| Thomas S. McMillan
|  | Democratic
| 1924
| Incumbent re-elected.
| nowrap | 

|-
! 
| Butler B. Hare
|  | Democratic
| 1924
| Incumbent re-elected.
| nowrap | 

|-
! 
| Frederick H. Dominick
|  | Democratic
| 1916
| Incumbent re-elected.
| nowrap | 

|-
! 
| John J. McSwain
|  | Democratic
| 1920
| Incumbent re-elected.
| nowrap | 

|-
! 
| William Francis Stevenson
|  | Democratic
| 1917 
| Incumbent re-elected.
| nowrap | 

|-
! 
| Allard H. Gasque
|  | Democratic
| 1922
| Incumbent re-elected.
| nowrap | 

|-
! 
| Hampton P. Fulmer
|  | Democratic
| 1920
| Incumbent re-elected.
| nowrap | 

|}

South Dakota 

|-
! 
| Charles A. Christopherson
|  | Republican
| 1918
| Incumbent re-elected.
| nowrap | 

|-
! 
| Royal C. Johnson
|  | Republican
| 1914
| Incumbent re-elected.
| nowrap | 

|-
! 
| William Williamson
|  | Republican
| 1920
| Incumbent re-elected.
| nowrap | 

|}

Tennessee 

|-
! 
| B. Carroll Reece
|  | Republican
| 1920
| Incumbent re-elected.
| nowrap | 

|-
! 
| J. Will Taylor
|  | Republican
| 1918
| Incumbent re-elected.
| nowrap | 

|-
! 
| Sam D. McReynolds
|  | Democratic
| 1922
| Incumbent re-elected.
| nowrap | 

|-
! 
| Cordell Hull
|  | Democratic
| 1922
| Incumbent re-elected.
| nowrap | 

|-
! 
| Ewin L. Davis
|  | Democratic
| 1918
| Incumbent re-elected.
| nowrap | 

|-
! 
| Joseph W. Byrns Sr.
|  | Democratic
| 1908
| Incumbent re-elected.
| nowrap | 

|-
! 
| Edward Everett Eslick
|  | Democratic
| 1924
| Incumbent re-elected.
| nowrap | 

|-
! 
| Gordon Browning
|  | Democratic
| 1922
| Incumbent re-elected.
| nowrap | 

|-
! 
| Finis J. Garrett
|  | Democratic
| 1904
|  | Incumbent retired to run for U.S. Senate.New member elected.Democratic hold.
| nowrap | 

|-
! 
| Hubert Fisher
|  | Democratic
| 1916
| Incumbent re-elected.
| nowrap | 

|}

Texas 

|-
! 
| Eugene Black
|  | Democratic
| 1914
|  | Incumbent lost renomination.New member elected.Democratic hold.
| nowrap | 

|-
! 
| John C. Box
|  | Democratic
| 1918
| Incumbent re-elected.
| nowrap | 

|-
! 
| Morgan G. Sanders
|  | Democratic
| 1920
| Incumbent re-elected.
| nowrap | 

|-
! 
| Sam Rayburn
|  | Democratic
| 1912
| Incumbent re-elected.
| nowrap | 

|-
! 
| Hatton W. Sumners
|  | Democratic
| 1914
| Incumbent re-elected.
| nowrap | 

|-
! 
| Luther A. Johnson
|  | Democratic
| 1922
| Incumbent re-elected.
| nowrap | 

|-
! 
| Clay Stone Briggs
|  | Democratic
| 1918
| Incumbent re-elected.
| nowrap | 

|-
! 
| Daniel E. Garrett
|  | Democratic
| 1920
| Incumbent re-elected.
| nowrap | 

|-
! 
| Joseph J. Mansfield
|  | Democratic
| 1916
| Incumbent re-elected.
| nowrap | 

|-
! 
| James P. Buchanan
|  | Democratic
| 1912
| Incumbent re-elected.
| nowrap | 

|-
! 
| Tom Connally
|  | Democratic
| 1916
|  | Incumbent retired to run for U.S. Senate.New member elected.Democratic hold.
| nowrap | 

|-
! 
| Fritz G. Lanham
|  | Democratic
| 1919 
| Incumbent re-elected.
| nowrap | 

|-
! 
| Guinn Williams
|  | Democratic
| 1922
| Incumbent re-elected.
| nowrap | 

|-
! 
| Harry M. Wurzbach
|  | Republican
| 1920
|  | Incumbent lost re-election.New member elected.Democratic gain.
| nowrap | 

|-
! 
| John Nance Garner
|  | Democratic
| 1902
| Incumbent re-elected.
| nowrap | 

|-
! 
| Claude Benton Hudspeth
|  | Democratic
| 1918
| Incumbent re-elected.
| nowrap | 

|-
! 
| Thomas L. Blanton
|  | Democratic
| 1916
|  | Incumbent retired to run for U.S. Senate.New member elected.Democratic hold.
| nowrap | 

|-
! 
| John Marvin Jones
|  | Democratic
| 1916
| Incumbent re-elected.
| nowrap | 

|}

Utah 

|-
! 
| Don B. Colton
|  | Republican
| 1920
| Incumbent re-elected.
| nowrap | 

|-
! 
| Elmer O. Leatherwood
|  | Republican
| 1920
| Incumbent re-elected.
| nowrap | 

|}

Vermont 

|-
! 
| Elbert S. Brigham
|  | Republican
| 1924
| Incumbent re-elected.
| nowrap | 

|-
! 
| Ernest Willard Gibson
|  | Republican
| 1923 
| Incumbent re-elected.
| nowrap | 

|}

Virginia 

|-
! 
| S. Otis Bland
|  | Democratic
| 1918
| Incumbent re-elected.
| nowrap | 

|-
! 
| Joseph T. Deal
|  | Democratic
| 1920
|  | Incumbent lost re-election.New member elected.Republican gain.
| nowrap | 

|-
! 
| Andrew Jackson Montague
|  | Democratic
| 1912
| Incumbent re-elected.
| nowrap | 

|-
! 
| Patrick H. Drewry
|  | Democratic
| 1920
| Incumbent re-elected.
| nowrap | 

|-
! 
| Joseph Whitehead
|  | Democratic
| 1924
| Incumbent re-elected.
| nowrap | 

|-
! 
| Clifton A. Woodrum
|  | Democratic
| 1922
| Incumbent re-elected.
| nowrap | 

|-
! 
| Thomas W. Harrison
|  | Democratic
| 1916
|  | Incumbent lost re-election.New member elected.Republican gain.
| nowrap | 

|-
! 
| R. Walton Moore
|  | Democratic
| 1919 
| Incumbent re-elected.
| nowrap | 

|-
! 
| George C. Peery
|  | Democratic
| 1922
|  | Incumbent retired.New member elected.Republican gain.
| nowrap | 

|-
! 
| Henry St. George Tucker III
|  | Democratic
| 1922
| Incumbent re-elected.
| nowrap | 

|}

Washington 

|-
! 
| John Franklin Miller
|  | Republican
| 1916
| Incumbent re-elected.
| nowrap | 

|-
! 
| Lindley H. Hadley
|  | Republican
| 1914
| Incumbent re-elected.
| nowrap | 

|-
! 
| Albert Johnson
|  | Republican
| 1912
| Incumbent re-elected.
| nowrap | 

|-
! 
| John W. Summers
|  | Republican
| 1918
| Incumbent re-elected.
| nowrap | 

|-
! 
| Samuel B. Hill
|  | Democratic
| 1923 
| Incumbent re-elected.
| nowrap | 

|}

West Virginia 

|-
! 
| Carl G. Bachmann
|  | Republican
| 1924
| Incumbent re-elected.
| nowrap | 

|-
! 
| Frank L. Bowman
|  | Republican
| 1924
| Incumbent re-elected.
| nowrap | 

|-
! 
| William S. O'Brien
|  | Democratic
| 1926
|  | Incumbent lost re-election.New member elected.Republican gain.
| nowrap | 

|-
! 
| James A. Hughes
|  | Republican
| 1926
| Incumbent re-elected.
| nowrap | 

|-
! 
| James F. Strother
|  | Republican
| 1924
|  | Incumbent retired.New member elected.Republican hold.
| nowrap | 

|-
! 
| Edward T. England
|  | Republican
| 1926
|  | Incumbent lost re-election.New member elected.Democratic gain.
| nowrap | 

|}

Wisconsin 

|-
! 
| Henry A. Cooper
|  | Republican
| 1920
| Incumbent re-elected.
| nowrap | 

|-
! 
| Charles A. Kading
|  | Republican
| 1926
| Incumbent re-elected.
| nowrap | 

|-
! 
| John M. Nelson
|  | Republican
| 1920
| Incumbent re-elected.
| nowrap | 

|-
! 
| John C. Schafer
|  | Republican
| 1922
| Incumbent re-elected.
| nowrap | 

|-
! 
| Victor L. Berger
|  | Socialist
| 1922
|  | Incumbent lost re-election.New member elected.Republican gain.
| nowrap | 

|-
! 
| Florian Lampert
|  | Republican
| 1918
| Incumbent re-elected.
| nowrap | 

|-
! 
| Joseph D. Beck
|  | Republican
| 1920
|  | Incumbent retired to run for governor.New member elected.Republican hold.
| nowrap | 

|-
! 
| Edward E. Browne
|  | Republican
| 1912
| Incumbent re-elected.
| nowrap | 

|-
! 
| George J. Schneider
|  | Republican
| 1922
| Incumbent re-elected.
| nowrap | 

|-
! 
| James A. Frear
|  | Republican
| 1912
| Incumbent re-elected.
| nowrap | 

|-
! 
| Hubert H. Peavey
|  | Republican
| 1922
| Incumbent re-elected.
| nowrap | 

|}

Wyoming 

|-
! 
| Charles E. Winter
|  | Republican
| 1922
|  | Incumbent retired to run for U.S. Senate.New member elected.Republican hold.
| nowrap | 

|}

Non-voting delegates 

|-
! 
| Daniel A. Sutherland
|  | Republican
| 1920
| Incumbent re-elected.
| nowrap | 

|-
! 
| Victor S. K. Houston
|  | Republican
| 1926
| Incumbent re-elected.
| nowrap | 

|-
! rowspan=2 | 
| Pedro Guevara
| bgcolor= | Nacionalista
| 1922
| Incumbent re-elected.
| nowrap | 

|-
| Isauro Gabaldón
| bgcolor= | Nacionalista
| 1920
| Incumbent resigned July 16, 1928.New resident commissioner elected.Nacionalista hold.
| nowrap | 

|}

See also
 1928 United States elections
 1928 United States presidential election
 1928 United States Senate elections
 70th United States Congress
 71st United States Congress

Notes

References

 https://history.house.gov/Institution/Election-Statistics/1928election